Spectrotrota is a monotypic genus of moths in the family Pyralidae. Its sole species, Spectrotrota fimbrialis, is found in Australia.

The genus formerly also included Spectrotrota normalis, which is now considered to belong to the genus Araeopaschia instead.

References

Epipaschiinae
Moths of Australia
Moths described in 1891
Monotypic moth genera
Pyralidae genera